Stephen Kane is a full professor of astronomy and planetary astrophysics at the University of California, Riverside who specializes in exoplanetary science. His work covers a broad range of exoplanet detection methods, including the microlensing, transit, radial velocity, and imaging techniques. He is a leading expert on the topic of planetary habitability and the habitable zone of planetary systems. He has published hundreds of peer reviewed scientific papers and has discovered/co-discovered several hundred planets orbiting other stars. He is a prolific advocate of interdisciplinarity science and studying Venus as an exoplanet analog.

Education 
Kane graduated from Macquarie University with a Bachelors of Science in Physics in 1994. In 1995 Kane received First Class with Honors at the same institution for his work studying a galactic extended source, which he identified as a previously unknown supernova remnant. In 2000 Kane received his Ph.D. from the University of Tasmania with a thesis focusing on gravitational microlensing, the bending of space by gravity which has a variety of astrophysics applications, including the discovery of exoplanets.

Career 
During his graduate degree, Kane had the title of research assistant at the Space Telescope Science Institute in 1996. After graduating, Kane joined the University of St. Andrews in 2001 as a postdoctoral research fellow, he collaborated with a team of scientists that discovered the coldest, smallest known exoplanet (OGLE-2005-BLG-390Lb), confirming the hopes that observation of habitable planets was within the reach of technology[7]. Kane and the entire SuperWASP (Super Wide Angle Search for Planets) team was later awarded the Royal Astronomical Society's Group Achievement Award in 2010 for their discovery of 18 exoplanets. In 2005 he returned to the United States to work as a postdoctoral associate at the University of Florida where he discovered some of the hottest known exoplanets of the time. In 2008 Kane became a research scientist at the NASA Exoplanet Science Institute (NExScI) at the California Institute of Technology (Caltech) where he focused his research on exoplanet habitability, the study of properties and conditions favorable to life. While at Caltech he and collaborator Dawn Gelino created the Habitable Zone Gallery, a website dedicated to providing information on exoplanets for both scientists and the general public. Kane joined San Francisco State University in 2013 and was promoted to Associate Professor in 2016. In August 2016, Kane and collaborators released the "Catalog of Kepler Habitable Zone Exoplanet Candidates", identifying numerous Habitable Zone planets discovered by the Kepler mission. In 2017, Kane moved his research team to the University of California, Riverside where he joined their astrobiology initiative, funded by the NASA Astrobiology Institute.

Media attention 
 2018 - Exoplanets May Help Us Understand How Venus Turned Into a Hell Planet
 2018 - Venus may once have been habitable. Now it can tell us if other worlds might be as well.
 2018 - Venus Is Still Key To Finding Life Outside Our Solar System, Astrobiologists Argue
 2017 - Earth-sized alien worlds are out there. Now, astronomers are figuring out how to detect life on them
 2017 - Nearby Solar System Wolf 1061 May Be The Key To Understanding Venus-like Worlds
 2016 - The 20 Most Earth-Like Exoplanets We've Found
 2016 - Endor's End: How the 'Star Wars' Death Star Wiped Out the Ewoks After All
 2016 - Most eccentric planet ever known flashes astronomers with reflected light
 2016 - This Is The ‘Most Eccentric’ Planet Yet Known
 2015 - Beloved Star Wars Worlds
 2015 - Newly discovered exoplanet orbits a pair of stars
 2015 - UC Berkeley astronomer Geoffrey Marcy's sexual harassment scandal
 2015 - New ‘Tatooine’ Discovery Confirms Circumbinary Planets Aren’t Just Science Fiction
 2015 - Tales from the Superbowl of Astronomy
 2014 - Science consultant for Sid Meier's Civilization video game
 2012 - Life can survive on eccentric planets (CBS, NASA)
 2012 - Space Telescope Finds 100 Billion Alien Worlds in Milky Way
 2004 - BBC television series The Sky at Night episode titled Planet Quest

References 

Living people
Place of birth missing (living people)
San Francisco State University faculty
University of Tasmania alumni
Macquarie University alumni
21st-century Australian astronomers
1973 births